August Wilhelm Ambros (17 November 181628 June 1876) was an Austrian composer and music historian of Czech descent.

Life 
He was born in Mýto, Rokycany District, Bohemia. His father was a cultured man, and his mother was the sister of Raphael Georg Kiesewetter (1773–1850), the musical archaeologist and collector. Ambros studied at the University of Prague and was well-educated in music and the arts, which were his abiding passion. He was, however, destined for the law and an official career in the Austrian civil service, and from 1839 he occupied various important posts under the ministry of justice, music being an avocation.

From 1850 onwards, he became well known as a critic and essay-writer, and in 1860 he began working on his magnum opus, his History of Music, which was published at intervals from 1862 in five volumes, the last two (1878, 1882) being edited and completed by Otto Kade and Wilhelm Langhans.

Ambros was a professor of the history of music at Prague from 1869 to 1871. Also in Prague, he sat on the board of governors in the Prague Royal Conservatory. By 1872, he was living in Vienna and was employed by the Department of Justice as an officer and by Prince Rudolf's family as his tutor. Through his work in Vienna, he was given a leave of absence for half the year in order to let him travel the world to collect musical information to include in his History of Music book. He was an excellent pianist, and the author of numerous compositions reminiscent of Felix Mendelssohn.

Ambros died at Vienna, Austria at the age of 59.

Notes

1816 births
1876 deaths
People from Mýto
People from the Kingdom of Bohemia
19th-century Austrian musicians
19th-century Austrian male musicians
19th-century classical composers
19th-century Czech musicians
Austrian classical composers
Austrian male classical composers
Austrian people of German Bohemian descent
Charles University alumni
Czech male classical composers
German Bohemian people
Czech Romantic composers
Josquin scholars
19th-century musicologists